Fabien Onteniente (born 27 April 1958) is a French film director and screenwriter.

Filmography
 1989 : Bobby et l'aspirateur (short film)
 1992 : À la vitesse d'un cheval au galop 
 1995 : Tom est tout seul
 1996 : Le Tuteur (TV) 
 1998 : Grève party 
 2000 : Jet Set
 2001 : Tel épris (TV)
 2002 : 3 zéros 
 2004 : People
 2006 : Camping 
 2008 : Disco
 2010 : Camping 2
 2013 : Turf
 2016 : Camping 3
 2019 : All Inclusive
 2020 : 100% Bio (TV)

External links

 

French film directors
1958 births
Living people
French male screenwriters
French screenwriters